Marie-Ève Nault (born February 16, 1982), is a Canadian soccer defender. She is also a former player of the Ottawa Fury Women. She represented Canada women's national soccer team at the 2012 Summer Olympics, which won the bronze medal.

Playing career

Club
In January 2013, Nault signed a one-year contract with Swedish Damallsvenskan club KIF Örebro. She had been without a club since 2010, after her third stint with the Ottawa Fury ended. Nault initially agreed to play for Quebec City Amiral SC in 2012 if she was not selected to the Olympic team. She was included in Canada's training camp in April and was later selected as an alternate player. She resigned for KIF Örebro DFF for the 2015 season.

International
Nault made her first appearance for the Canada women's national soccer team on January 24, 2004, against China in the 2004 Four Nations Tournament. She represented Canada in the 2011 FIFA Women's World Cup, playing in two games against Germany and Nigeria. At the 2012 Olympics, head coach John Herdman initially selected Nault as an alternate, excluding her from the 18-woman squad. However, after Robyn Gayle and Emily Zurrer were injured in the group stage, Nault and fellow alternate Melanie Booth were selected as replacements. She would play in all of Canada's remaining matches, including their bronze medal-winning match against France. Nault retired from international football on January 13, 2017.

References

External links
 
 
 
 Marie-Eve Nault at University of Tennessee Soccer
 

1982 births
Living people
Canadian women's soccer players
Women's association football defenders
Footballers at the 2012 Summer Olympics
French Quebecers
Olympic soccer players of Canada
Olympic medalists in football
Olympic bronze medalists for Canada
KIF Örebro DFF players
Damallsvenskan players
AS Saint-Étienne (women) players
Canada women's international soccer players
Medalists at the 2012 Summer Olympics
Expatriate women's footballers in Sweden
Expatriate women's footballers in France
Expatriate women's soccer players in the United States
Canadian expatriate women's soccer players
Soccer people from Quebec
Sportspeople from Trois-Rivières
2015 FIFA Women's World Cup players
Tennessee Volunteers women's soccer players
Lesbian sportswomen
Canadian LGBT sportspeople
LGBT association football players
F.C. Indiana players
2011 FIFA Women's World Cup players
Ottawa Fury (women) players
USL W-League (1995–2015) players